Bezymeno is a rural locality (a selo) in Grayvoronsky District, Belgorod Oblast, Russia. The population was 841 as of 2010. There are 2 streets.

Geography 
Bezymeno is located 14 km south of Grayvoron (the district's administrative centre) by road. Glotovo is the nearest rural locality.

References 

Rural localities in Grayvoronsky District